

Players

Staff
Head coach
  Massimiliano Favo
Assistant coach
  Marco Lelli

Goalkeeper coach
  Maurizio Carbonari

Matches

Serie D – Girone F

Coppa Italia Serie D

Championship statistics

Results by round

Results summary

References

Ancona
U.S. Ancona 1905